The 1965–66 SM-sarja season was the 35th season of the SM-sarja, the top level of ice hockey in Finland. 12 teams participated in the league, and Ilves Tampere won the championship.

First round

Group A

Group B

Second round

Final round

Qualification round

External links 
 Season on hockeyarchives.info

Fin
Liiga seasons
SM